Peter Robert Carroll (born 7 November 1941) is an Australian former first-class cricketer and rugby union player.

Carroll was born at the Sydney suburb of Mosman in November 1941. He later studied as a mature student in England at Mansfield College at the University of Oxford. While studying at Oxford, he played first-class cricket for Oxford University from 1969–71, making fourteen appearances. Carroll scored 403 runs in his fourteen matches, at an average of 16.12 and a high score of 60 not out, his only first-class half century.

Besides playing first-class cricket, Carroll also played rugby union as a fullback at domestic level in both Australia and England. His teams at domestic level included Northern Suburbs in Australia and Harlequins and Oxford University. He made one appearance for the Barbarians, against Penarth RFC in April 1971.

References

External links

1941 births
Living people
Cricketers from Sydney
Alumni of Mansfield College, Oxford
Australian cricketers
Oxford University cricketers
Australian rugby union players
Harlequin F.C. players
Oxford University RFC players
Barbarian F.C. players
Rugby union players from Sydney
Australian expatriate sportspeople in England